Muncho Pass (el. ), also known as Muncho Lake Pass, Drogheda Lake Pass, or Muncho-Toad Pass, is the northernmost mountain pass in the Rocky Mountains to be traversed by a public highway. Located in Muncho Lake Provincial Park, British Columbia, Canada, the pass links the Toad River and Trout River drainages. The Alaska Highway travels across the pass.

See also
Sentinel Range (Canada)
Terminal Range

External links
Entry at bivouac.com

Mountain passes of British Columbia
Northern Interior of British Columbia
Canadian Rockies